Cleome hassleriana, commonly known as spider flower, spider plant, pink queen, or grandfather's whiskers,  is a species of flowering plant in the genus Cleome of the family Cleomaceae, native to southern South America in Argentina, Paraguay, Uruguay, and southeast Brazil. It has also been introduced to South Asia, including the Haor area of Bangladesh and India.

The plant is sometimes mistakenly identified as cannabis due to its leaves and general growth shape. The flowers are purple, pink, or white, with four petals and six long stamens. The fruit is a capsule up to 15 cm long and  broad, containing several seeds. Flowering lasts from late spring to early fall.

The scented blooms are sometimes compared to citronella.

C. hassleriana is commonly cultivated in temperate regions as a half-hardy annual. Numerous cultivars have been selected for flower color and other attributes. The "Queen" series includes the cultivars 'Violet Queen', 'Rose Queen', and 'White Queen'. The cultivar 'Helen Campbell' has gained the Royal Horticultural Society's Award of Garden Merit (confirmed 2017). 
Plants in cultivation have at times been misidentified as Cleome arborea, C. pungens or C. spinosa.

References

hassleriana
Annual plants
Flora of Brazil
Flora of Argentina
Flora of Uruguay
Flora of Paraguay
Garden plants